Robert Vertue (died in 1506) was an English architect and master mason.

He worked as a mason on the nave of Westminster Abbey between 1475 and 1490, and then as the master mason for Henry VII's riverside north range of Greenwich Palace, built in 1500–04 and a work at the Tower of London.

Along with his brother William, he was involved in the construction of Bath Abbey, the Tower of London (1501–1502) and possibly Henry VII's chapel at Westminster.

References

15th-century English architects
16th-century English architects
Stonemasons
Architects from London
Gothic architects
1506 deaths
Year of birth unknown